Bezerra may refer to:

 Bezerra (fungus), genus
 Bezerra (surname)
 Bezerra da Silva (1927–2005), Brazilian samba musician

See also
 Bezerra River (disambiguation)
 Bezerrão, a sports stadium in Brazil
 Bezerros, a municipality in Brazil